3rd Online Film Critics Society Awards 
2000

Best Film: 
 American Beauty 
The 3rd Online Film Critics Society Awards, honoring the best in film for 1999, were given in 2000.

Winners and nominees

Best Picture
American Beauty
Being John Malkovich
Fight Club
The Insider
Toy Story 2

Best Director
Sam Mendes – American Beauty
David Fincher – Fight Club
Spike Jonze – Being John Malkovich
Stanley Kubrick – Eyes Wide Shut
Michael Mann – The Insider

Best Actor
Kevin Spacey – American Beauty 
Jim Carrey – Man on the Moon
Russell Crowe – The Insider
Richard Farnsworth – The Straight Story
Edward Norton – Fight Club

Best Actress
Reese Witherspoon – Election 
Annette Bening – American Beauty
Heather Donahue – The Blair Witch Project
Janet McTeer – Tumbleweeds
Hilary Swank – Boys Don't Cry

Best Supporting Actor
Haley Joel Osment – The Sixth Sense
Wes Bentley – American Beauty
Michael Clarke Duncan – The Green Mile
John Malkovich – Being John Malkovich
Christopher Plummer – The Insider

Best Supporting Actress
Catherine Keener – Being John Malkovich 
Thora Birch – American Beauty
Cameron Diaz – Being John Malkovich
Julianne Moore – Magnolia
Chloë Sevigny – Boys Don't Cry

Best Original Screenplay
Being John Malkovich – Charlie KaufmanAmerican Beauty – Alan Ball
Magnolia – Paul Thomas Anderson
The Sixth Sense – M. Night Shyamalan
Toy Story 2 – Andrew Stanton, Rita Hsiao, Doug Chamberlain and Chris Webb

Best Adapted ScreenplayElection – Alexander PayneFight Club – Jim Uhls
The Green Mile – Frank Darabont
The Insider – Eric Roth and Michael Mann
The Talented Mr. Ripley – Anthony Minghella

Best Foreign Language FilmRun Lola Run
All About My Mother
The Dreamlife of Angels
The Red Violin
Xiu Xiu: The Sent Down Girl

Best Documentary
Buena Vista Social Club
42 Up
American Movie
Mr. Death: The Rise and Fall of Fred A. Leuchter, Jr.
Trekkies

Best Cinematography
Sleepy Hollow – Emmanuel LubezkiAmerican Beauty – Conrad L. Hall
Eyes Wide Shut – Larry Smith
The Straight Story – Freddie Francis
Three Kings – Newton Thomas Sigel

Best EditingRun Lola Run – Mathilde BonnefoyAmerican Beauty – Tariq Anwar and Christopher Greenbury
Fight Club – James Haygood
The Limey – Sarah Flack
Three Kings – Robert K. Lambert

Best EnsembleAmerican Beauty
Being John Malkovich
Cradle Will Rock
The Green Mile
Magnolia

Best Original Score
South Park: Bigger, Longer & Uncut – Marc ShaimanAmerican Beauty – Thomas Newman
Eyes Wide Shut – Jocelyn Pook
Star Wars: Episode I – The Phantom Menace – John Williams
The Straight Story – Angelo Badalamenti

Best DebutSpike Jonze – Being John Malkovich
Charlie Kaufman – Being John Malkovich
Sam Mendes – American Beauty
Daniel Myrick and Eduardo Sánchez – The Blair Witch Project
Haley Joel Osment – The Sixth Sense

Best Official Film Website
Roger Ebert (suntimes.com/ebert/index.html)

Special OFCS Award
Internet Movie Database

References 

1999
1999 film awards